Mary Hilson is a British researcher at the School of European Languages, Culture and Society  and at the Department of Scandinavian Studies, University College London. She generally focuses on modern Nordic societies. She has also written several books.

Early life
Hilson was educated at the University of Exeter, receiving a PhD in Economic and Social History, and at Uppsala University.

Career
Hilson was a visiting researcher at the Centre for Nordic Studies (Renvall Institute, Helsinki University).

Bibliography
 The Nordic Model: Scandinavia since 1945 (2008)
 Political Change and the Rise of Labour in Comparative Perspective: Britain and Sweden 1890-1920 (2006)

External links
 http://www.ucl.ac.uk/scandinavian-studies/staff/hilson.htm
 https://www.academia.edu/5800336/The_Nordic_Model_Scandinavia_Since_1945._Mary_Hilson_reviewed_under_former_name_K._William_McKechnie_
 http://www.nordicacademicpress.com/forfattare/mary-hilson/
 https://www.amazon.com/The-Nordic-Model-Scandinavia-Contemporary/dp/1861893663

Living people
Alumni of the University of Exeter
Uppsala University alumni
Year of birth missing (living people)